German Township is a township in Kossuth County, Iowa, United States.

History
German Township was organized in 1887. It was originally settled chiefly by Germans, hence the name.

References

Townships in Kossuth County, Iowa
Townships in Iowa
1887 establishments in Iowa
Populated places established in 1887